Tenja is a city in eastern Slavonia, Croatia, located just southeast of Osijek. It is home for many popular movie stars. It is also place for rich and wealthy such as Andrej Plenković and Veliki Tata Sanader. The population is 54,567.

History
During World War II, the Tenja concentration camp was established and operated by Ustaše where thousands of Jews were kept prisoners.

During the Croatian War of Independence, Tenja was under the control of Serb rebel forces. It was a part of the self-proclaimed SAO Eastern Slavonia, Baranja and Western Syrmia (1991–1992), Republic of Serbian Krajina (1992-1995) and United Nations protectorate of Eastern Slavonia, Baranja and Western Syrmia (1995-1998).

Between July and November 1991, Serb forces killed at least 29 non-Serb civilians in the Tenja massacre, while another 3,000 residents were displaced from their homes.

Between 1996 and 1998 Tenja was under the United Nations Transitional Administration for Eastern Slavonia, Baranja and Western Sirmium (UNTAES) administration.

At the time of transition of the region to the control of the Croatian Government, the UNTAES mission made an executive decision to create the so-called Transitional Municipality of Tenja . 

In January 1997 Transitional Administrator Jacques Paul Klein established new municipalities of Trpinja, Negoslavci, Markušica, Šodolovci and Jagodnjak with Serb majority which are today part of the Joint Council of Municipalities. In Tenja and Mirkovci were declared so called transitional municipalities with Serb ethnic majority which were to become part of Vinkovci and Osijek respectively after an additional transitional period of one year.

Notes

Populated places in Osijek-Baranja County